Croviana (local dialect: Croviàna) is a comune (municipality) in Trentino in the northern Italian region Trentino-Alto Adige/Südtirol, located about  northwest of Trento.

Croviana borders the following municipalities: Malè, Cles and Dimaro Folgarida

Demographic evolution

References

External links
 Homepage of the city

Cities and towns in Trentino-Alto Adige/Südtirol